Zala is a variety of the Ometo languages spoken in Gamo-Gofa Zone, Ethiopia. There is little information on it. It may be a dialect of Wolaitta, Gofa, or a distinct language in the central Ometo dialect continuum.

References
Cerulli, Enrico. 1929. Note su alcune popolazioni Sidama dell'Abesinia meridionale 2: I Sidama dell'Omo. Rivisita degli Studi Orientalia, 12. (Il linguaggio degli Zala: 37–39.)
Blench, 2006. The Afro-Asiatic Languages: Classification and Reference List

Languages of Ethiopia
North Omotic languages